Amanda Marie Chidester (born April 11, 1990) is an American former professional softball player and current assistant coach for Michigan. She was named National Pro Fastpitch Player of the Year for the Chicago Bandits in 2019. She has been a member of the USA Softball Women's National Team on-and-off since 2012. She played college softball at Michigan from 2009 to 2012 and was named First Team All-Big Ten three of her seasons. She was twice selected as the Big Ten Conference Player of the Year and National Fastpitch Coaches Association All-American. Chidester represented Team USA at the 2020 Summer Olympics and won a silver medal. In 2021, Chidester played her second season in the Athletes Unlimited Softball league and placed second in individual points earned.

Early years
Chidester was born in 1990 and grew up in Allen Park, Michigan.  She attended St. Francis Cabrini High School, graduating in 2008.  As a senior in 2008, she was selected as the Detroit Catholic League Female Athlete of the Year.  In 2007, she was named the Gatorade Michigan Softball Player of the Year.  She was also selected as a first-team EA Sports All-American in both 2007 and 2008.

College career
Chidester enrolled at the University of Michigan in the fall of 2008.  As a freshman in the spring of 2009, Chidester appeared in 58 games and led the Michigan softball team with a .350 batting average.  She was selected as a second-team NFCA All-American and a first-team All-Big Ten player.

As a sophomore in 2009, Chidester started all 57 games for Michigan, including 56 games at second base.

As a junior in 2010, Chidester moved to third base. She started all 58 games for Michigan, including 51 at third base and seven at catcher.  She led the team with a .423 batting average and 75 RBIs.  At the end of the season, she was selected as the Big Ten Conference Player of the Year and a first-team NFCA All-American at third base.

As a senior in 2011, Chidester was the captain of the Michigan softball team.  She started 58 games for Michigan, including 13 at third base and 45 at first base. She compiled a .347 batting average with 46 RBIs and was named Big Ten Player of the Year for the second consecutive year. On May 25, 2013, she became the second Michigan Wolverines softball player to reach 200 career RBIs.

Team USA
In June 2012, Chidester was named to the USA Softball Women's National Team. She hit a grand slam to lead Team USA to a victory over Brazil in the 2012 World Cup of Softball.

At the Tokyo Games, Chidester garnered four hits and drove in three runs for Team USA. She and the team lost in the gold medal game against Team Japan 2-0 on July 27, 2021, with Chidester going making three outs at the plate.

Professional career
During the 2019 season, Chidester was named the NPF Player of the Year, NPF Offensive Player of the Year, and Home Run Award winner.

Coaching career
On September 6, 2022, Chidester was named an assistant coach for the Michigan Wolverines softball team.

Personal life 
Chidester is openly lesbian and is engaged to a Mexican softball player Anissa Urtez.

Statistics

References

External links
 
 
 
 Amanda Chidester on Telegram

1990 births
Lesbian sportswomen
LGBT people from Michigan
American LGBT sportspeople
LGBT softball players
Living people
Olympic softball players of the United States
Chicago Bandits players
Michigan Wolverines softball players
Pan American Games silver medalists for the United States
Pan American Games medalists in softball
People from Allen Park, Michigan
Scrap Yard Dawgs players
Softball players at the 2015 Pan American Games
Softball players from Michigan
Medalists at the 2015 Pan American Games
Softball players at the 2020 Summer Olympics
Medalists at the 2020 Summer Olympics
Olympic silver medalists for the United States in softball
Olympic medalists in softball
21st-century American LGBT people